Hellesveor is a hamlet near St Ives (where the 2011 census population was included) in west Cornwall, England.

References

Hamlets in Cornwall